Nippo–Vini Fantini–Faizanè was a UCI Professional Continental cycling team based in Italy. The team was founded as Centri della Calzatura–Partizan in 2008.

The team folded after the 2019 season, due to financial reasons following restructuring of the UCI World Tour.

Doping
On December 21, 2017, Pierpaolo De Negri tested positive for anabolic androgenic steroids.

Final roster

Major wins

2008
Overall Cinturó de L'Empordà, Luca Zanasca 
Stage 1, Luca Zanasca

2009
GP Industria & Artigianato di Larciano, Daniele Callegarin
Stage 1 Szlakiem Grodów Piastowskich, Daniele Callegarin
Overall Tour de Serbie, Davide Torosantucci
Stage 2, Yahuen Sobal
Overall Course de Solidarność et des Champions Olympiques, Artur Krol
Stage 3, Artur Krol
Overall Gp Cycliste de Gemenc, Zsolt Dér
Stage 5 Vuelta Ciclista a León, Luca Zanasca

2010
Stage 3 Giro della Provincia di Reggio Calabria, Giuseppe Muraglia
Overall Tour de Serbie, Luca Ascani
Stage 6, Davide D'Angelo

2011
Stage 6 Tour de San Luis, Miguel Ángel Rubiano
Stage 4 Tour of South Africa, Davide Torosantucci
Stages 5 & 7 Tour of South Africa, Bernardo Riccio
Overall Tour de Kumano, Fortunato Baliani
Prologue, Maximiliano Richeze
Stage 2, Fortunato Baliani
Stages 1, 6 & 7 Okolo Slovenska, Maximiliano Richeze
Stage 3 Okolo Slovenska, Miguel Ángel Rubiano
Overall Brixia Tour, Fortunato Baliani
Stage 3 Tour de Hokkaido, Junya Sano
Stage 4 Tour de Hokkaido, Miguel Ángel Rubiano
   
2012
Pan American Road Race Championship, Maximiliano Richeze
Stage 1 Tour de Korea, Mauro Richeze
Overall Tour of Japan, Fortunato Baliani
Stage 2, Maximiliano Richeze
Stage 3, Julián Arredondo
Stage 4, Fortunato Baliani 
Overall Tour de Kumano, Fortunato Baliani
Stage 1, Maximiliano Richeze
Stage 2, Fortunato Baliani
Stage 3, Mauro Richeze
Stages 1, 5 & 6 Tour de Serbie, Maximiliano Richeze
Stage 4 Tour de Serbie, Fortunato Baliani
Stages 1, 7, 8 & 10 Vuelta a Venezuela, Maximiliano Richeze
Stage 4 Tour de la Guadelupe, Simone Campagnaro
Overall Tour de Hokkaido, Maximiliano Richeze
Stages 2 & 3, Maximiliano Richeze
  
2013
 Overall Tour de Langkawi, Julián Arredondo
Stage 5, Julián Arredondo
Stage 3 Boucle de l'Artois, Leonardo Pinizzotto
Stages 3 & 4 Mzansi Tour, Mauro Richeze
Stage 2 Flèche du Sud, Mauro Richeze
Stage 4 Flèche du Sud, Alberto Cecchin
Overall Tour of Japan, Fortunato Baliani
Overall Tour de Kumano, Julián Arredondo
Stage 2, Julián Arredondo
Stages 2 & 5 Tour de Serbie, Mauro Richeze
Stage 1 Tour de Hokkaido, Leonardo Pinizzotto

2014
Stage 1 Circuit des Ardennes, Pierpaolo De Negri
Stage 3 Circuit des Ardennes, Grega Bole
Stages 5 & 6 Carpathian Couriers Race, Eduard-Michael Grosu
Stage 1 Szlakiem Grodów Piastowskich, Grega Bole
Stage 3 Tour of Japan, Pierpaolo De Negri
 Overall Tour of Estonia, Eduard-Michael Grosu
Stage 1, Eduard-Michael Grosu
Stage 1 Tour de Korea, Grega Bole
 Under-23 Time Trial Championships, Manabu Ishibashi
Stages 6 & 10 Tour of Qinghai Lake, Grega Bole
Stage 12 Tour of Qinghai Lake, Eduard-Michael Grosu
Stage 1 Tour de Hokkaido, Alessandro Malaguti

2015
Stage 3 Tour of Japan, Nicolas Marini
Stage 2 Tour of Slovenia, Pierpaolo De Negri
Overall Tour de Hokkaido, Riccardo Stacchiotti
Stages 1 & 3, Riccardo Stacchiotti
Stage 2, Daniele Colli
Overall, Tour of China I, Daniele Colli
Stage 4, Daniele Colli
Stages 2, 3 & 6 Tour of China II, Nicolas Marini

2016
Gran Premio della Costa Etruschi, Grega Bole
Overall Tour de Korea, Grega Bole
Stage 8 Tour of Qinghai Lake, Nicolas Marini
Stage 3 Tour de Hokkaido, Pierpaolo De Negri
Stage 5 Tour of China I, Nicolas Marini
Stage 4 Tour of Taihu Lake, Nicolas Marini
Stage 5 Tour of Taihu Lake, Eduard-Michael Grosu

2017
Volta Limburg Classic, Marco Canola
Stages 2, 3 & 5 Tour of Japan, Marco Canola
 Time Trial Championships, Eduard-Michael Grosu
Stage 6 Tour of Qinghai Lake, Damiano Cunego
Stage 12 Tour of Qinghai Lake, Nicolas Marini
Stage 7 Tour of Utah, Marco Canola
Stage 1 Tour of Taihu Lake, Nicolas Marini

2018
Stage 2 Tour of Croatia, Eduard Grosu
 Time Trial Championships, Eduard-Michael Grosu
 Road Race Championships, Eduard-Michael Grosu
Stages 3, 7 & 8 Tour of Qinghai Lake, Eduard Grosu
Overall Tour of Xingtai, Damiano Cima
Stage 1, Damiano Cima
Stage 6 Tour of China I, Damiano Cima
Coppa Sabatini, Juan José Lobato
Tour de Okinawa, Alan Marangoni

2019
Stage 5 Tour de Taiwan, Giovanni Lonardi
Stage 1 The Princess Maha Chakri Sirindhorn's Cup, Giovanni Lonardi
Stage 18 Giro d'Italia, Damiano Cima
 Overall Tour de Korea, Filippo Zaccanti
Stage 4 Tour of Utah, Marco Canola
Overall Tour de Hokkaido, Filippo Zaccanti
Stage 1, Filippo Zaccanti

References

External links
 

Cycle racing in Guadeloupe
Cycling teams established in 2008
Cycling teams based in Japan
UCI Professional Continental teams
Cycling teams based in Italy
Defunct cycling teams based in Italy
Cycling teams disestablished in 2019
2008 establishments in Italy
2019 disestablishments in Italy